Frizzi is a surname of Italian origin. Notable people with the surname include:
 
 Fabrizio Frizzi (1958–2018), Italian television presenter and voice actor
 Fabio Frizzi (born 1951), Italian musician and composer
 Lazzaro Frizzi, Italian politician and patriot

Italian-language surnames